The 2020 Women's EuroHockey Indoor Club Cup was the 31st edition of the Women's EuroHockey Indoor Club Cup, Europe's premier women's club indoor hockey tournament organized by the European Hockey Federation. It was held from 14 to 16 February 2020 at the Sportcampus Zuiderpark in The Hague, Netherlands.

Düsseldorfer HC won their second title by defeating the hosts hdm 4–2 in the final. Sumchanka took the bronze medal and East Grinstead and Arminen were relegated to the Trophy division.

Teams
Participating clubs qualified based on their country's final rankings from the 2019 competition. The champions from the top six countries from last year's edition together with the top two from the 2019 EuroHockey Indoor Club Trophy qualified. England and Austria were the two promoted countries that replaced Switzerland and Belgium.

Results
All times are local, CET (UTC+1).

Preliminary round

Pool A

Pool B

Fifth to eighth place classification

Pool C
The points obtained in the preliminary round against the other team were taken over.

First to fourth place classification

Semi-finals

Third place game

Final

Final standings

 Relegated to the EuroHockey Indoor Club Trophy

See also
2020 Euro Hockey League Women
2020 Men's EuroHockey Indoor Club Cup

References

Women's EuroHockey Indoor Club Cup
Club Cup
International women's field hockey competitions hosted by the Netherlands
EuroHockey Indoor Club Cup
EuroHockey Indoor Club Cup
Sports competitions in The Hague
21st century in The Hague
EuroHockey Indoor Club Cup